NX Zero was a Brazilian rock band formed in 2001 in São Paulo, the band consists Di Ferrero (vocals), Gee Rocha (guitar and backing vocals), Daniel Weksler (drums), Caco Grandino (bass) and Fi Ricardo (guitar).
   
The band released their debut album through Urubuz Records, Diálogo?, in 2004. After this album, the band signed with Universal Music and released six more albums: NX Zero, in 2006, Agora, in 2008, Sete Chaves, in 2009, Projeto Paralelo, in 2010, Multishow ao Vivo: NX Zero 10 Anos, in 2011 and Em Comum, in 2012. According to ABPD the Band has won two singles Disk Diamond, "Incontrolável" and "Consequência", "Cedo Ou Tarde" with platinum and "Razões e Emoções" with platinum, with a total of more than a 100 thousand downloads paid only in Brazil.
      
NX Zero was in ninth place in the top 50 best selling CDs in Brazil. The debut sold more than 145,000 copies and the DVD 62 Mil Horas Até Aqui, about 43,000. They received a proposal to rewrite their songs in other languages. They released songs in English and Spanish.

Band members

Current members 
 Daniel Weksler: drums (2001 - 2017)
 Fi Ricardo: electric guitar (2003 - 2017)
 Gee Rocha: bass guitar (2003 - 2006), electric guitar and backing vocals (2003 - 2017)
 Di Ferrero: lead vocals (2004 - 2017)
 Caco Grandino: bass guitar (2006 - 2017)

Past members 
 Phillip Peep: lead vocals and bass guitar (2001 - 2003)
 Yuri Nishida: electric guitar (2001 - 2004), lead vocals (2003 - 2004)

Discography

Studio albums 

 (2004) Diálogo?
 (2006) NX Zero
 (2008) Agora
 (2009) Sete Chaves
 (2012) Em Comum
 (2015) Norte

Remix albums 

 (2010) Projeto Paralelo

Live albums 

 (2011) Multishow ao Vivo: NX Zero - 10 Anos
 (2017) Norte ao Vivo

Video albums 

 (2008) 62 Mil Horas Até Aqui
 (2010) Multishow Registro: Sete Chaves
 (2011) Projeto Paralelo
 (2011) Multishow ao Vivo: NX Zero - 10 Anos
 (2017) Norte ao Vivo

External links
 Official website

Brazilian alternative rock groups
Brazilian musical groups
Musical groups established in 2001
Musical groups disestablished in 2017
Latin Grammy Award winners
2001 establishments in Brazil
2017 disestablishments in Brazil